Old Things New is the sixth studio album by American country music artist Joe Nichols, released on October 27, 2009 by Universal South Records. It produced two singles: "Believers", which peaked at number 26 on the Billboard Hot Country Songs chart, and "Gimmie That Girl" which became his third number-one song in May 2010. "The Shape I'm In" is the album's third single to radio on July 19, 2010.

Track listing

Personnel
Adapted from liner notes

Lisa Cochran - background vocals (tracks 5, 9)
J.T. Corenflos - electric guitar (track 9), baritone guitar (track 9)
Eric Darken - percussion (all tracks except 9 & 10)
Greg Droman - electric guitar (track 4)
Dan Dugmore - steel guitar (tracks 3, 4, 6, 7, 9)
Shannon Forrest - drums (tracks 3, 5, 6, 8, 9), percussion (track 9)
Larry Franklin - fiddle (tracks 1, 2)
Paul Franklin - steel guitar (tracks 1, 2)
Vince Gill - background vocals (track 3)
Kenny Greenberg - electric guitar (track 7)
Aubrey Haynie - fiddle (tracks 3, 4, 6), mandolin (tracks 5, 7, 9)
Wes Hightower - background vocals (all tracks except 3 & 10)
David Hungate - bass guitar (tracks 3, 6, 9)
Mike Johnson - steel guitar (tracks 5, 8)
Charlie Judge - keyboards (track 5)
Shane Keister - Fender Rhodes (track 3), piano (tracks 6, 9) 
Tim Lauer - harmonica (track 7), piano (track 3), B-3 organ (tracks 3, 9), Wurlitzer (track 6)
B. James Lowry - acoustic guitar (tracks 5, 8)
Brent Mason - electric guitar (tracks 1, 2, 4, 7)
Mac McAnally - acoustic guitar (tracks 3, 6, 9)
James Mitchell - electric guitar (tracks 5, 8)
Gordon Mote - piano (tracks 5, 8, 10)
Steve Nathan - piano (track 2), B-3 organ (tracks 1, 4), Wurlitzer (track 7)
Joe Nichols - lead vocals (all tracks)
Michael Rhodes - bass guitar (tracks 1, 2, 4, 7)
Brent Rowan - 6-string bass (track 6), electric guitar (tracks 3, 5, 6, 8, 9), harmonium (track 3), solo (tracks 5, 8, 9)
Russell Terrell - background vocals (tracks 1, 2, 4, 7)
Ilya Toshinsky - acoustic guitar (tracks 1, 2, 4, 7)
Lonnie Wilson - drums (tracks 1, 2, 4, 7)
Craig Young - bass guitar (track 5, 8)

Chart performance

Album

End of year charts

Singles

References

2009 albums
Joe Nichols albums
Show Dog-Universal Music albums
Albums produced by Brent Rowan
Albums produced by Mark Wright (record producer)